Megachile azarica is a species of bee in the family Megachilidae. It was described by Theodore Dru Alison Cockerell in 1945.

References

Azarica
Insects described in 1945